was a feudal domain of the Tokugawa shogunate of Edo period Japan, located in former Mikawa Province, in what is now the modern-day city of Nishio in Aichi Prefecture, Japan. It was centered on Nishio Castle.

History
When Tokugawa Ieyasu became independent of the Imagawa clan in 1561, he established Nishio Castle, and assigned his close hereditary retainer, Sakai Masachika to become its first castellan. It was a mark of Ieyasu’s favor and trust, as Sakai Masachika was the first of Ieyasu’s retainers to be so honored.  Following the Battle of Sekigahara, the Sakai clan was reassigned to more lucrative territories in western Japan, and was replaced by a branch of the Honda clan as first rulers of the new Nishio-han. The domain changed hands with almost every generation, reverting for periods to tenryō  status under direct control of the Tokugawa shogunate. The Doi clan held the territory for almost 100 years (1663-1747), and the Ogyu branch of the Matsudaira clan from 1764 until the Meiji restoration in 1867.
The final daimyō, Matsudaira Noritsune, took part in the Second Chōshū expedition, and was assigned to guard Osaka and Kyoto, but presided over domain deeply divided between pro- and anti- Shogunal factions. He surrendered to the new Meiji government during the Boshin War, after the defection of many junior samurai to the pro-Imperial cause.
The domain had a population of 55,220 people in 13,039 households per the 1867 census, of whom 51,119 people were classed as farmers. The domain maintained its primary residence (kamiyashiki) in Edo at Daimyo-koji, in Marunouchi. Until the An’ei period (1772-1781)
Nishio Domain was not a single contiguous territory, but consisted of many widely scattered holdings, which at the end of the Edo period consisted of:
Mikawa Province: 112 villages in Hazu, 19 villages in Kamo, 7 villages in Nukata,  4 villages in Hoi,  1 village in Hekikai
Suruga Province: 8 villages in Kitō,  2 villages in Haibara,  1 village in Fuji, 1 village in Suntō,
Echizen Province: 27 villages in Nyū, 7 villages in Nanjō District, Fukui, 3 villages in Sakai

After the abolition of the han system in July 1871, the domain became “Nishio Prefecture”, which later became part of Nukata Prefecture, and finally Aichi Prefecture.

List of daimyō

References

External links
 Nishio Domain on "Edo 300 HTML"

Notes

Domains of Japan
1601 establishments in Japan
States and territories established in 1601
1871 disestablishments in Japan
States and territories disestablished in 1871
Mikawa Province
Domains of Aichi Prefecture
Honda clan
Ii clan
Ogyū-Matsudaira clan
Ōta clan